Katabasia or Katavasia (Greek καταβασία, from καταβαίον, "descend") is a type of hymn, and the last troparion of an ode of a canon, chanted in the Eastern Orthodox Church and those Eastern Catholic Churches which follow the Byzantine Rite. Its name is derived from the Greek word katabasia for descent, so called because the cantors used to descend from their stalls and unite in the middle of the church to sing them.

The katabasia is an irmos that is sung at the end of an ode of the canon. The katabasia is chanted by the choir, who descend from their seats (kathismata) and stand on the floor of the church to sing it, whence its name. Katabasia are chanted at Matins and sometimes during other Divine Services such as Compline. They are also found at other occasional services such as the Mystery of Unction or funerals.

At Matins, on ordinary weekdays, only Odes 3, 6, 8 and 9 have katabasia. On Sundays and higher-ranking feast days, there will be a katabasia at the end of each ode (these are called Festal Katabasia). Most of the other services which use katabasia will have them only after the 3rd, 6th, 8th and 9th odes.

Ordinary katabasia
On ordinary weekdays (that is, days which do not fall on a Sunday or higher-ranking feast day), the irmos from the canon being chanted is repeated at the end as katabasia. When several canons are tied together, as is normally the case at Matins, only the irmos of the first canon is chanted, subsequent irmoi being omitted. The irmos of the final canon in the string will be chanted at the very end of Odes 3, 6, 8 and 9 as katabasia.

Festal katabasia
On Sundays and feast days, Festal Katabasia are used at the end of each ode. These are not necessarily the same as the irmoi of the canon. Which particular Festal Katabasia are used will depend upon the liturgical season. The festal Katabasia are used in anticipation of a Great Feast, and throughout its Afterfeast. During the rest of the year, the Festal Katabasia to the Theotokos (Mother of God) are used.

The following table concerns the chanting of Katabasia on Sundays and Feast Days throughout the year (ordinary weekdays use the Irmos from the last canon chanted on that day) in the Russian Orthodox Church.

§  Usually February 9, but if Great Lent begins early, the apodosis may be earlier.
§§ Usually February 10, but if Great Lent begins early, the apodosis may be earlier.
*  Moveable cycle; the exact dates will differ from year to year, depending upon the date of Easter. During Great Lent the proper Katabasia are found in the Triodion, during the Paschal season they are found in the Pentecostarion.
° Mid-Pentecost falls on the 4th Wednesday of Pascha and lasts for one week, being a "feast within a feast". The Katabasia of Mid-Pentecost are chanted only on the day of the feast and on its Apodosis (the following Wednesday); on the other days of Mid-Pentecost, the Katabasia used are those of Pascha.

See also
Acolouthia

References 

Eastern Orthodox liturgical music
Eastern Christian liturgy
Byzantine Rite
Eastern Christian hymns
Liturgy of the Hours